Attera Orbis Terrarum is the name of the series of tours by Swedish black metal band Dark Funeral in promotion of their 2005 studio album Attera Totus Sanctus. Several shows as well as recordings from other eras of Dark Funeral's history were accounted on the following live DVDs:

Attera Orbis Terrarum – Part I – mainly consisted of shows performed in Europe, 2005–2006
Attera Orbis Terrarum – Part II – mainly consisted of shows performed in South America, October 2006

Dark Funeral video albums
Album series